Magic Treehouse may refer to:

The Magic Treehouse, the debut album from Guatama
Magic Tree House, a book series for young adults by Mary Jane Osborne
Magic Tree House (film), a 2013 Japanese anime drama film based on the novel series